Paul Johnson (born 5 April 1992) is an English former professional footballer who plays for Spennymoor Town as a central defender.

Career

Hartlepool United
Born in Sunderland, Johnson joined Hartlepool United at the age of 12. He turned professional in 2010, making his senior debut in April 2011.

In May 2011 he signed a new contract with the club. And next season, he had a successful three-month loan spell at Conference North side Workington where he received praise from the Reds' manager Darren Edmondson with him saying "Paul has been fantastic for us, he's grown as a player and learned more about the game than playing meaningless Reserve games. It's been a pleasure to aid his development. He returns to Hartlepool an improved footballer and shows what effect the non league can have on the development of young talent."

He was an unused substitute in a 2–1 win away at Bury shortly before he was loaned to local rivals Darlington for the rest of the season. He made his debut a day later as he played the full match in a 0–2 league defeat to Ebbsfleet United.

He rejoined Workington on loan in February 2013, making 17 appearances for the club.

Johnson was released by Hartlepool at the end of the 2012–13 season.

Non-league
After his release from Hartlepool, it was reported that Workington boss Darren Edmondson tried to get Johnson to join Workington permanently but hit a stumbling block due to wages. Johnson joined Carlisle-based Northern League side Celtic Nation in June, on a one-year deal, where he was reunited with Mick Wadsworth who was Johnson's coach at Hartlepool United.

Paul left Celtic Nation to join Spennymoor Town in the summer of 2014.

References

1992 births
Living people
English footballers
Hartlepool United F.C. players
Garforth Town A.F.C. players
Workington A.F.C. players
Darlington F.C. players
Celtic Nation F.C. players
Spennymoor Town F.C. players
English Football League players
National League (English football) players
Association football defenders